Zhou Peng may refer to:

 Zhou Peng (basketball) (born 1989), Chinese professional basketball player
 Zhou Peng (canoeist) (born 1983), Chinese canoeist
 Sa Dingding (born 1983 as Zhou Peng), Chinese singer-songwriter